The Bergamasque Prealps are a mountain range within the Alps. The range is located in Lombardy, in the north of Italy.

Geography
Administratively the range belongs to the Italian province of Bergamo and, to a lesser extent, to the provinces of Lecco and Brescia.

The western slopes of the mountains are drained by the Adda, the central and eastern part of the range by Oglio and other minor rivers and streams, all of them tributaries of the Po.

SOIUSA classification
According to SOIUSA (International Standardized Mountain Subdivision of the Alps) the mountain range is an Alpine subsection, classified in the following way:
 main part = Eastern Alps
 major sector = Southern Limestone Alps
 section = Bergamasque Alps and Prealps
 subsection = Bergamasque Prealps
 code = II/C-29.II

Borders
The Bergamo Prealps stretch between Lake Como (west) and Lake Iseo (east). They are separated from the Bergamo Alps (north) by some secondary valleys of Val Brembana, Val Seriana and Val Camonica: Valsassina, Valtorta, Val Secca, Valcanale, Val Nembo, Val di Scalve and Val Paisco. Towards south they end with the Po plain.

Subdivision
The Bergamasque Prealps are subdivided into three supergroups:
 Catena Campelli-Resegone-Grigne (or Prealpi Bergamasche Occidentali) - SOIUSA code: II/C-29.II-A,
 Catena Arera-Alben (or Prealpi Bergamasche Centrali) - SOIUSA code: II/C-29.II-B,
 Catena Presolana-Pora-Concarena (or Prealpi Bergamasche Orientali) - SOIUSA code: II/C-29.II-C.

Notable summits

Some notable summits of the range are:

See also
 Bergamo Alps

Maps
 Italian official cartography (Istituto Geografico Militare - IGM); on-line version: www.pcn.minambiente.it

References

Mountain ranges of the Alps
Mountain ranges of Lombardy
Province of Brescia
Province of Bergamo
Province of Lecco